War is a 2019 Indian Hindi-language action-thriller film directed by Siddharth Anand and written by Anand, Aditya Chopra, Shridhar Raghavan and Abbas Tyrewala. Produced by Yash Raj Films, the film is the third installment in the YRF Spy Universe. It stars Hrithik Roshan and Tiger Shroff in lead roles with Vaani Kapoor, Ashutosh Rana and Anupriya Goenka playing supporting roles. In the film, Khalid Rahmani (Shroff), an Indian soldier who works for RAW, is assigned to eliminate his former mentor Kabir Dhaliwal (Roshan), who has gone rogue.

Principal photography commenced in September 2018 and wrapped up in March 2019. The film was initially Tentatively titled Fighters, but later on 15 July 2019, when its teaser was unveiled, the official name was announced as War. The film score and soundtrack album was scored by Vishal–Shekhar. War was released in theatres worldwide on 2 October 2019, coinciding to Gandhi Jayanti, with dubbed versions in Tamil and Telugu. 

The film received positive reviews from critics, with particular praise for Shroff's and Roshan's performance, direction, action sequences, VFX and musical score. It broke all opening day and weekend box-office records for a Hindi film, with its collections, until it was surpassed by Pathaan (2023).

Plot 
Major Kabir Dhaliwal kills V. K. Naidu, a veteran RAW agent, in New Delhi, instead of his assignment to kill Iraqi terrorist, Farid Haqqani. The agency, led by Defence Minister Sherna Patel and Colonel Sunil Luthra, summon Captain Khalid Rahmani, Kabir's protégé, to capture him. 

Past: It is revealed that Khalid's father, Major Abdul Rahmani, betrayed the army in a previous mission, leaving Kabir with two gunshot wounds and his partner dead. Kabir then sought and killed Abdul for his betrayal. Reluctant to work with Khalid, Kabir eventually allows him to join his squad, consisting of RAW agents Saurabh, Prateek, Muthu, and Aditi, on a successful mission, in Tikrit, to kill a cell of Haqqani's associates. The group succeeds in arresting terrorist Basheer Hassib, in-turn causing their main target, Rizwan Ilyasi, a terrorist-cum-businessman, to come out of hiding. The squad reunite to target Ilyasi in Marrakesh, but as they capture him, he tells Kabir that he planted a mole in his team. Saurabh reveals himself as the mole, by killing Prateek and Muthu. This starts a rooftop chase, with Khalid chasing Saurabh. On the ground, a shootout ensues between Kabir and Ilyasi's men, and Kabir gets shot, temporarily knocking him out. He wakes up at the hospital a few days later and meets a severely injured Khalid, who tells him that he killed Saurabh.

Present: Khalid is nearly taken off the mission to capture Kabir, when Jimmy Shroff, a Lieutenant colonel, is murdered by Kabir. Kabir then organizes a public meeting with Khalid on the train, informing him that his next target is Dr. Utpal Biswas. Later in Lisbon, Khalid is unable to prevent Biswas from being killed by Kabir. After the incident, Khalid is suspended by RAW. Khalid tracks Kabir down through a previous case; he learns Kabir is on a covert mission to find a government hard drive with secret codes, and is targeting Ilyasi’s known associates. Khalid also learns Kabir faked a relationship with Naina Sahni, a dancer, to get her to spy on Firoze Contractor, one of Iliyasi's previous associates. Naina was ultimately murdered by Firoze, who Kabir deduces is actually Ilyasi, who took on Firoze's identity following a plastic surgery by Dr. Mallika Singhal. Kabir and Khalid agree to work together, but Kabir's hideout is attacked; they escape and reach Kerala, to Aditi's wedding, and recover a hard drive with the secret codes. Kabir hands the drive to Khalid, for safekeeping. 

Later, while celebrating the mission's success on a houseboat, Khalid poisons Kabir by lacing TTX in his drink. It is revealed that Khalid was ultimately shot dead by Ilyasi, during their mission in Marrakesh. Saurabh then underwent a plastic surgery by Dr. Mallika Singhal, to disguise himself as Khalid. Saurabh throws Kabir into the river and returns to Ilyasi, who is based on a heavily armed icebreaker ship, in the Arctic Circle. Kabir then parachutes aboard, eliminating Ilyasi’s militia. Kabir tells Saurabh he knew that he was not Khalid, having seen him shoot perfectly from his right side and drink alcohol. Khalid lacked peripheral vision in his right eye, owing to a bullying incident in his childhood and refused to drink alcohol, due to religious beliefs. Kabir acquired an antidote to TTX from Aditi and inserted a tracker in the drive, which he handed over to Saurabh, for safekeeping. Saurabh shoots Ilyasi dead and escapes the ship to a derelict church. A brutal fight between Kabir and Saurabh culminates with Kabir killing him by collapsing the church's dome onto him.

Khalid is posthumously honoured for his bravery and sacrifice, while his mother, Nafeesa, receives an award from the Prime Minister, on his behalf. Kabir, who is still officially designated a traitor by both the army and RAW, now takes care of Ruhi, Naina's daughter. After having a chat with Luthra, Kabir agrees to a covert mission to kill Haqqani. Later, Kabir and Ruhi surf together at Bondi Beach in Sydney, fulfilling Naina's wish of surfing with her.

Cast 

 Hrithik Roshan as Major Kabir Dhaliwal
 Tiger Shroff as in a dual role as Captain Khalid Rahmani / Captain Saurabh Patil (after plastic surgery)
 Vaani Kapoor as Naina Sahni
 Ashutosh Rana as Colonel Sunil Luthra
 Anupriya Goenka as RAW agent Aditi Nahta
 Yash Raaj Singh as Captain Saurabh Patil (before plastic surgery)
 Dipannita Sharma as Dr. Mallika Singhal, plastic surgeon
 Mashhoor Amrohi as Firoze Contractor / Rizwan Ilyasi (after plastic surgery)
 Soni Razdan as Nafeesa Rahmani, Khalid's mother
 Arif Zakaria as Dr. Utpal Biswas
 Mohit Chauhan as Retired RAW agent V. K. Naidu
 Swaroopa Ghosh as Defence Minister Sherna Patel
 Sanjeev Vatsa as Rizwan Ilyasi (before plastic surgery)
 Dishita Sehgal as Ruhi Sahni
 Imran Ahamed as RAW agent Saini
 Jessey Lever as Captain Muthu
 Amit Gaur as Lieutenant colonel Jimmy Shroff (Para SF)
 Ravi Awana as Basheer Hassib
 Anil Khopkar as  Prime Minister

Production

Development 
On Yash Chopra's birth anniversary, Yash Raj Films announced a new action film starring Hrithik Roshan and Tiger Shroff. Vaani Kapoor was finalised to play the female lead. Two international action choreographers from Hollywood and Korea were employed to design action sequences.

The climax scene of the film was shot on the Arctic Circle, becoming the first-ever Indian film to do so. Siddharth Anand, the director of the film stated, "We want to push the benchmark of action movies that are made in our country. So, we are bringing two of the biggest action choreographers together to design some of the most outlandish and visually-spectacular sequences. On one hand, we have Andy R Armstrong from Hollywood and on the other, we have Mr SeaYoung Oh, who is an outstanding martial arts action choreographer from South Korea."

Filming 
Principal photography began in the second week of September 2018. The film also has a dance off between the two stars in the song "Jai Jai Shivshankar". The film schedule was wrapped up in the beginning of March 2019. The film has been shot in multiple exotic locations at Delhi, Uttarakhand, Kerala, Portugal, Italy, Finland, Sweden, Switzerland and Georgia. The bike chase sequence between the two stars was filmed in Portugal. The car chase sequence which is the climax of the film was shot at the Arctic Circle.

Music 

The music of the film is composed by Vishal–Shekhar, with lyrics written by Kumaar. All themes are composed by Sanchit Balhara and Ankit Balhara.

Release 
The film was released on 2 October 2019, coinciding with the Gandhi Jayanti.

Reception

Box office 
War opened with collection of 53.35 crore on its first day. It was the highest opening day collection for Hindi film. On the second day it collected 24.35 crore, On the third day it collected 22.45 crore, taking its total collection to 100.15 crore. War has already created six new records as the film reaches to 100 crore mark at the box-office. The film entered the 100 Crore Club in three days of its release. The extended opening weekend collection of the film at 166.25 crore is the highest opening weekend collection for any 2019 Bollywood film. The film by crossing 200 crore in its opening week has become the fastest Bollywood film of 2019 to achieve the feat.

As of now, with gross of 378.46 crore from India and 97.04 crore from overseas, the film has grossed 475.50 crore worldwide, and has become the highest-grossing Indian film of 2019.

Critical response 
War received generally positive reviews from critics; on the review aggregator website Rotten Tomatoes, the film holds a rating of 72% based on 15 reviews, with an average rating of 7/10.

Among positive reviews, Anupama Chopra said "War is a popcorn entertainer and you can't ask too many questions but if you're willing to suspend disbelief, the twists and turns exert a solid grip." A writer for Bollywood Hungama gave the film four stars out of five, and said "War is an action entertainer which has style as well as enough twists and turns to keep the viewers engrossed. At the box office, the extended weekend, dazzling action, stunning international locales and stylish execution will ensure mammoth footfalls for the film". Taran Adarsh gave it four stars out of five and called the film "[e]scapist cinema at its best". Komal Nahta of Film Information opined, "The film could prove to be the starting of a new franchise for the Yash Raj Films banner". Writing for India TV, Sonal gave the film three and a half stars out of five, writing, "Hrithik Roshan, Tiger Shroff of Abbas Mustan kinda twists, turns, characters, situations, logic, gravity, physics, chemistry, and some Ekta Kapoor-esque tricks all tossed together to make a visually spectacular concoction". Rajeev Masand of News18 gave the film two and a half out of five stars and said, "Both Hrithik Roshan and Tiger Shroff fully commit to the action, bringing swag to the big stylish sequences and a visceral energy to the one-on-one punch-ups in the movie."

Among the reviewers who granted the film mixed reviews, The Times of India rated it three stars out of five and felt the film had "lot of style, stunts and show, but lacking a solid storyline". India Today rated it two and a half stars out of five and wrote, "War is a crowd-puller, but it isn't meant to further the cause of cinema". Daily News and Analysis gave three stars out of five and wrote, "War seems more like a Hrithik Roshan and YRF come back than anything else". Writing for The Indian Express, Shubhra Gupta granted the film two stars out of five, stating, "The chief trouble with War is that all the space is divvied up between Hrithik Roshan and Tiger Shroff, that the poor baddies don't really get a chance". Writing for Firstpost, Anna M. M. Vetticad gave two stars out of five, opining that the film "could have been a suspenseful, eyecatching, entertaining ride. But for its politics... [it] is a painfully condescending ode to Muslim loyalty to our vatan, an ode that is particularly cynical and offensive". Saibal Chatterjee of NDTV gave the film one and a half stars out of five and stated, "Powered by two loose-limbed and resolutely stone-faced male leads, Hrithik and Tiger, War is all style and no substance".

Accolades

Future 

At a launch party for War, Anand confirmed that he was working on the script of its sequel and had plans to convert the film into a franchise, depending on the audience response to the film.

Notes

References

External links 
 
 
 
 

2019 films
2010s Hindi-language films
2019 action thriller films
2010s chase films
Indian action thriller films
Indian chase films
Films about the Research and Analysis Wing
Yash Raj Films films
Films set in Mumbai
Films shot in Mumbai
Films shot in Italy
Films shot in Portugal
Films shot in Switzerland
Films directed by Siddharth Anand